Broom-Stick Bunny is a 1956 Warner Bros. Looney Tunes short directed by Chuck Jones. The short was released on February 25, 1956, and stars Bugs Bunny. The short is notable for being June Foray's first project for Warner Bros., which led to her voicing other Looney Tunes characters such as Granny. This was also Foray's first time working with Jones. She continued to collaborate with him after Warners' closed their animation department. Foray herself would continue to collaborate with Warner Bros. up until her death.

Plot
It is Halloween night, and Witch Hazel is concocting a batch of witch's brew. As she goes about her business, she pauses at her magic mirror and asks it who is the ugliest one of all. The genie in the mirror replies that she, Witch Hazel, is the ugliest one of all. Hazel explains to the audience that she is "deathly afraid" of getting prettier as she grows older; then laughs this notion off as the absurdity it is.

Meanwhile, Bugs Bunny is out trick-or-treating dressed as a witch, his face hidden by an ugly green mask. He calls on Witch Hazel, who, seeing his costume, mistakes him for an actual witch ("I don't remember seeing her at any of the union meetings."). After making a comment about Bugs' appearance ("Isn't she the ugliest little thing?"), she dashes to her magic mirror and asks it a second time who is the ugliest one of all. The genie  looks towards Bugs, also thinks that he is a witch and replies that he actually finds Bugs far uglier.

The jealous witch then hatches a plot: she invites the disguised Bugs in for tea, and prepares a potion containing an assortment of beauty enhancers. Bugs is about to drink the tea when he remembers that he is still wearing his mask and takes it off. Seeing that her "rival" is a rabbit, Witch Hazel dashes off to consult her cookbook. Sure enough, one of the ingredients for the brew she was making earlier is a rabbit's clavicle.

While she is gone, Bugs suspects that there is trouble afoot and makes to leave, but he is stopped by Witch Hazel brandishing a meat cleaver. Bugs flees, with the cackling witch chasing him through the house. During the chase, Hazel dashes to her magic broom closet to grab her flying broomstick to keep up with Bugs, but the broom she mounts starts sweeping the floor with her clinging to it until she lets go ("Crazy me, that was my sweeping broom!"). Bugs takes shelter behind a wall; Witch Hazel, using a carrot on a fishing rod, manages to capture him.

Back at her cauldron, Hazel prepares to kill Bugs and use him in her potion. She is about to bring her cleaver down on the trussed-up rabbit, but he plays to her sympathies, gazing back at her with tear-filled doe eyes. Overcome with mercy, Witch Hazel bursts into tears, saying his innocent face reminds her of Paul, her pet tarantula. Bugs tries to comfort her by bringing her the cup of beauty elixir disguised as tea, which she unknowingly drinks. Hazel instantly changes into a curvy redheaded beauty (a caricature of what Hazel's voice actress, June Foray, looked like at the time) as Milt Franklyn strikes up "Oh, You Beautiful Doll" in the background.

Horrified, Hazel dashes to her magic mirror a third time and asks the genie (in a much more gentle and dulcet tone, Foray's natural voice) who is the ugliest one of all. Upon seeing this beauty, the genie gives a very Bob Hope-like "ROWR, ROWR!", and immediately falls for her. Hazel retreats as he, intending to grab her, lunges from the mirror. She flees on her flying broom—unfortunately, the genie is chasing her on his flying carpet, and he is slowly catching up. Bugs (who has somehow managed to free his arms from his bonds) promptly calls the local air raid headquarters on Hazel's telephone to report "a genie with light brown hair chasin' a flying sorceress!".

Cast
Mel Blanc as Bugs Bunny and Genie

June Foray as Witch Hazel (Uncredited)

References

External links
 

1956 films
1956 animated films
1956 short films
Looney Tunes shorts
Warner Bros. Cartoons animated short films
Short films directed by Chuck Jones
American films about Halloween
Films about witchcraft
Films scored by Milt Franklyn
Bugs Bunny films
1950s Warner Bros. animated short films
Films produced by Edward Selzer
Genies in film
1950s English-language films